The 1922–23 French Ice Hockey Championship was the ninth edition of the French Ice Hockey Championship, the national ice hockey championship in France. Chamonix Hockey Club won their first championship.

Final
 Chamonix Hockey Club - Club des Sports d’Hiver de Paris 2:0 (2:0, 0:0)

External links
Season on hockeyarchives.info

French
1922–23 in French ice hockey
Ligue Magnus seasons